Ramiro Ledesma Ramos (23 May 1905 – 29 October 1936) was a Spanish philosopher, politician, writer, essayist, and journalist, known as one of the pioneers in the introduction of Fascism in Spain.

Early life
After studying Arts and Sciences at the Central University of Madrid, where he was a disciple of José Ortega y Gasset, and contributing to La Gaceta Literaria, El Sol  and Revista de Occidente, Ledesma Ramos began studying the works of Martin Heidegger. He also wrote a novel for the youth, entitled El sello de la muerte ("The Seal of Death").

Attracted to both Benito Mussolini's Corporatism, and the developing Nazi movement of Adolf Hitler in Germany, he was troubled by his middle class roots, which he saw as an obstacle in reaching out to the revolutionary milieu of Spanish politics in the 1920s. In 1931, Ledesma Ramos began publishing the periodical La Conquista del Estado, named in tribute to Curzio Malaparte's Italian Fascist magazine La Conquista dello Stato—one of the first publications of the Spanish National-Syndicalism. It attempted to bridge the gap between nationalism and the anarcho-syndicalist of the dominant trade union, the Confederación Nacional del Trabajo (CNT), by revising Syndicalism altogether.

His admiration for Nazism brought him to imitate Adolf Hitler's hairstyle.

La Conquista del Estado and the Falange 
In the very first issue of the La Conquista del Estado (The Conquest of the State), Ledesma published a syncretic program, which advertised statism, a political role for the universities, regionalisation, and a syndicalist structure for the national economy. The paper was only published throughout the year, and, although a subject of debate in a CNT reunion, it never had the intended impact.

He subsequently led his group into an October 1931 merger with Onésimo Redondo's Junta Castellana de Actuación Hispánica, creating the Juntas de Ofensiva Nacional-Sindicalista, and its magazine JONS. It became the Falange Española de las Juntas de Ofensiva Nacional-Sindicalista (FE-JONS), after it fused with José Antonio Primo de Rivera's group in 1934; he personally designed the movement's badge, the yoke and the arrows derived from the Catholic Monarchs, and coined the mottos Arriba España and Una, Grande y Libre (both of which were still in use in Francoist Spain).

Death and legacy 
The group remained stable, despite the fact that Ledesma left over disagreements with Primo de Rivera; he formed a small group, La Patria Libre, which opposed the Falange on ideological grounds, displaying the same favorable attitude to the left-wing trade unions.

The outbreak of the Spanish Civil War caught Ledesma in Republican Madrid, far from the forces of Francisco Franco. Imprisoned by the Popular Front government because of suspected espionage throughout the summer and early autumn of 1936, he was executed by the Republican militia.

One of the key figures of Francoist propaganda, Ramiro Ledesma was nonetheless viewed with suspicion by the highly influential Roman Catholic Church—which had even threatened to censor his works through the Index Librorum Prohibitorum.

Quotes 
 [On himself:] "The red shirt of Garibaldi fits Ramiro Ledesma and his comrades better than the black shirt of Mussolini."

Works 
 Discurso a las juventudes de España (Speech to the Youth of Spain)
 ¿Fascismo en España? (Fascism in Spain?)
 La Conquista del Estado (The Conquest of the State)
 Escritos filosóficos, &c. (Philosophical Writings, etc.)

See also 
 José Antonio Primo de Rivera
 Onésimo Redondo

References

External links 
 Spanish language biography

1905 births
1936 deaths
People from the Province of Zamora
Executed politicians
Falangists
Francoist Spain
Spanish people of the Spanish Civil War (National faction)
Spanish essayists
Spanish fascists
Spanish novelists
Spanish male novelists
National syndicalists
Acción Española
Executed Spanish people
People killed by the Second Spanish Republic
20th-century Spanish novelists
20th-century essayists
20th-century Spanish journalists
Spanish magazine founders